Rutland is an unincorporated community in south Bibb County, Georgia, United States. It is part of the Macon Metropolitan Statistical Area.

Notes

Unincorporated communities in Georgia (U.S. state)
Unincorporated communities in Bibb County, Georgia
Macon metropolitan area, Georgia